Pride is the third album by Phosphorescent and his first on the Dead Oceans label. It was released on October 23, 2007.

The song "Wolves" was used in the 2011 film Margin Call.

Track listing
"A Picture of Our Torn Up Praise" - 3:17
"Be Dark Night" - 4:00
"Wolves" - 6:15
"At Death, A Proclamation" - 1:53
"The Waves at Night" - 4:18
"My Dove, My Lamb" - 9:26
"Cocaine Lights" - 6:02
"Pride " - 6:10

References

2007 albums
Phosphorescent (band) albums
Dead Oceans albums